In the Holy Roman Empire, Landeshoheit or superioritas territorialis (translated as territorial superiority, territorial supremacy or territorial sovereignty) was the authority possessed by the immediate lords within their own territories. It was possessed by all imperial estates and imperial knights. It has often been conflated with sovereignty but while it "carried with it nearly all the ingredients or attributes of true sovereignty, [it] was legally distinct from it, and was everywhere in Germany admitted to be so."

The Peace of Westphalia has frequently been portrayed as conferring full sovereignty on at least the imperial princes. In fact, the princes' powers were not expanded, but the right of their aristocratic subjects (mediate lords) to maintain military forces was removed. The princes' rights to make treaties and to enter into alliances and thus to engage in foreign relations was not affected but remained "constrained by the obligation not to harm the emperor or Empire." Their authority in their own territories remained "circumscribed by imperial law and by the emperor's formal position as their feudal overlord".

Notes

Sources

Legal history of the Holy Roman Empire